Captain Richard Seymour-Conway, 4th Marquess of Hertford KG (22 February 1800 – 25 August 1870) was an English aristocrat and sometime politician who spent his life in France devoted to collecting art. From birth to 1822 he was styled Viscount Beauchamp and from 1822 to 1843 Earl of Yarmouth.

Early life
Lord Hertford was the son of Francis Seymour-Conway, 3rd Marquess of Hertford and Maria Seymour-Conway, Marchioness of Hertford. He had two siblings, Lord Henry Seymour-Conway, who also died unmarried, and Lady Frances Maria Seymour-Conway (the wife of the Marquis de Chevigne). His paternal grandparents were Francis Ingram-Seymour-Conway, 2nd Marquess of Hertford and, his second wife, Hon. Isabella Anne Ingram (eldest daughter and co-heiress of Charles Ingram, 9th Viscount of Irvine), who was the mistress of the Prince of Wales, later King George IV.

Although Lord Hertford was born in England, he was brought up in Paris by his mother, who had become estranged from his father.

Career
While Earl of Yarmouth he served as a British MP for County Antrim from 1822 to 1826, but he spent most of his life in Paris, in a large apartment in the city and, from 1848, at the Château de Bagatelle, a small country house in the Bois de Boulogne on the outskirts. When shown the extent of his Irish possessions, he is reported to have replied, "Well, I see it for the first time, and pray God! for the last time." His English residences were Hertford House in Manchester Square, London, now home to the Wallace Collection, and Ragley Hall, which still belongs to the family.

According to the Goncourt brothers, Lord Hertford was "a complete, absolute, unashamed monster" who once proudly declared that "when I die I shall at least have the consolation of knowing that I have never rendered anyone a service."

Lord Hertford died in 1870, aged 70 in Paris, unmarried and without legitimate issue, and his titles passed to his distant cousin Francis Seymour. Lord Hertford's illegitimate son and secretary, Sir Richard Wallace, 1st Baronet (1818–1890), inherited his art collection.

Art collection
Manchester House (as Hertford House was originally known) was let until 1850 as the French embassy, but from 1852 was used principally to house items from Hertford's art collection. He was an important art collector, named after his illegitimate son Sir Richard Wallace, to whom he left it and as much property as was not entailed. Wallace's widow bequeathed the collection of paintings and objects to the nation and form the nucleus of the Wallace Collection.

References

Further reading

External links

 Biography from the Wallace collection 

1800 births
1870 deaths
Knights of the Garter
Members of the Parliament of the United Kingdom for County Antrim constituencies (1801–1922)
UK MPs 1820–1826
Hertford, M4
British expatriates in France
British people of Italian descent
English art collectors
People associated with the Wallace Collection
Richard
Burials at Père Lachaise Cemetery
British landowners
4
19th-century British businesspeople